Gruffydd ab Owain (died ) was a joint king of Glywysing in Wales along with his brother Cadwgan. His other brother Morgan ruled in Gwent.

His death was recorded in the Annals of Wales. Phillimore's reconstruction of the dates places the entry in AD 935. Afterwards, his brother Cadwgan seems to have ruled Glywysing alone until his death .

References

Year of birth unknown
935 deaths
10th-century Welsh monarchs
Monarchs of Morgannwg